Stenanthemum liberum is a species of flowering plant in the family Rhamnaceae and is endemic to the southwest of Western Australia. It is a dwarf or prostrate shrub with densely hairy young stems, elliptic to egg-shaped with the narrower end towards the base, and densely hairy heads of tube-shaped flowers.

Description
The edges of the leaves are curved downwards and tips of the leaves have a short, down-curved point. The lower surface of the leaves is densely covered with hairs pressed against the surface.

Taxonomy and naming
Stenanthemum liberum was first formally described in 2001 by Barbara Lynette Rye in the journal Nuytsia from specimens collected near South Ironcap in 1996. The specific epithet (liberum) means "free", referring to the stipules.

Distribution and habitat
This species grows in open woodland and is only known from a small are near South Ironcap, east of Hyden in the Coolgardie and Mallee bioregions of south-western Western Australia.

Conservation status
Stenanthemum liberum is listed as "Priority One" by the Government of Western Australia Department of Biodiversity, Conservation and Attractions, meaning that it is known from only one or a few locations which are potentially at risk.

References

liberum
Rosales of Australia
Flora of Western Australia
Plants described in 2001
Taxa named by Barbara Lynette Rye